KLMY (99.7 FM) is a radio station licensed to Long Beach, Washington, United States.  The station is owned by Ohana Media Group and features programming from Westwood One.

History
The station was assigned the call sign KLBP on January 30, 1986.  On November 28, 1986, it changed its call sign to KKEE, on January 11, 2001 to KKEE-FM, on January 18, 2001 to KAQX, on January 30, 2006 to KAST-FM with an adult contemporary format, on January 14, 2009 to KJOX-FM with a sports format from ESPN Radio, and on February 23, 2010 to the current KLMY.

References

External links

LMY
Radio stations established in 1989
1989 establishments in Washington (state)
Hot adult contemporary radio stations in the United States